Inquirer Holdings Incorporated (also known as the Inquirer Group of Companies) is a mass media conglomerate based in Makati, Philippines with the Philippine Daily Inquirer as its flagship brand. The company is majority-owned by Pinnacle Printers Corporation, the holding investment arm of the Rufino-Prieto matriarch.

List of properties owned by the Inquirer Group

Newspapers
 Philippine Daily Inquirer
 Inquirer Bandera
 Cebu Daily News (Cebu; ceased print publication on December 30, 2018, but continues to publish news online as CDN Digital)
 Inquirer Libre
 Tumbok (now defunct since 2007 - 2008)
 Junior Inquirer (defunct since 2018)

Magazines
Hinge Inquirer Publications (HIP), formerly Hinge Media Inc. (HMI), was established in 2003.

 F&B World
 MultiSport
 Cocoon
 Look
 Baking Press
 Turista
 Game!
 Scout
 PBA Life
 Baby
 Northern Living
 Southern Living
 Cebu Living
 Makati Leads
 Soul BGC
 Inquirer RED

Inquirer.net
Inquirer Interactive Inc., better known as Inquirer.net, is the official website of the Philippine Daily Inquirer.  It provides comprehensive coverage of both local and international news throughout the site's channels: News, Entertainment, Lifestyle, Technology, Business, Global Nation, and its recently relaunched Sports channel, which includes the official homepage of the Philippine Basketball Association.

Broadcasting

Trans-Radio Broadcasting Corporation is a radio company based in Makati. Founded in 1971 by Emilio Tuason, TRBC is the broadcasting arm of the Inquirer Group.

Radyo Inquirer (DZIQ 990 kHz Manila) is the radio station of the Philippine Daily Inquirer, with its broadcast team semi-independent of the main paper editorial team as it is mostly composed of career radio people.  Its first terrestrial test broadcast on radio was on August 16, 2010, with Inquirer columnist Ramon Tulfo and broadcasting veteran Jay Sonza headlining the list of broadcasters for the new station.

Inquirer 990 Television is a teleradyo-formatted news channel of the Philippine Daily Inquirer currently broadcasting on digital terrestrial television. Programs from the main radio feed are simultaneously aired on the television channel. Inquirer 990 TV is also airing TV programs simulcast on the radio feed such as "Arlyn Dela Cruz Reports", "Radyo Inquirer 990 Special Report" and "Raw Talk".

Trans Radio used to have an FM station DWRT-FM 99.5 in Manila as 99.5 RT From its launch in 1976 until 1996, and DYIO 101.1 in Cebu as Y101 from 1980 to the early 1990s.

In December 2020, it was announced by the Inquirer Group that Radyo Inquirer will be transitioned into a digital news site. DZIQ went off-air in March 2020 and its television counterpart was shut down on December 31, 2020, due to the COVID-19 pandemic and Inquirer's loss of revenues caused by the lockdown as well as poor ratings of the station.

Megamobile
Founded in 2005, Megamobile is the online, mobile and outdoor solutions company of the Inquirer Group. Among its services are mobile application development, digital advertising, mobile value-added service and voice service.

Megamobile is the developer of the following mobile applications:
 Inquirer Mobile
 Bandera Mobile
 Inquirer Libre Mobile
 Cebu Daily News Mobile
 Inquirer 2BU
 Radyo Inquirer Mobile
 The Mind Museum Mobile (with  Bonifacio Arts Foundation Inc.)
 Friend Trip (with MMDA)
 #popeselfie
 Ad Summit PH (with  Association of Accredited Advertising Agencies of the Philippines (4As))
 APEC 2015
 PDS Skin (with the Philippine Dermatological Society)
 AgriBiz
 Viu Philippines (with PCCW Global)

References

 
Companies based in Makati
Mass media companies of the Philippines
Philippine radio networks
Television networks in the Philippines
Mass media companies established in 1985
1985 establishments in the Philippines
Privately held companies of the Philippines